Carlisle Kingmoor TMD is a railway traction maintenance depot situated in Carlisle, England. The depot is operated by the Direct Rail Services (DRS). The depot was originally used to service diesel locomotives and diesel multiple units. The current depot code is KM.  The original steam shed was called Carlisle (Kingmoor) and its shed code was originally 68A and later 12A.

The current depot is located on the opposite side of the West Coast Main Line to the original steam shed and was officially opened on 1 January 1968. Under British Rail control, the depot closed in 1987 and lay derelict until 1998 when the site was taken over by DRS. Since then a number of developments have taken place with the installation of a sand tower and increased office space.

Kingmoor marshalling yard is situated immediately to the north of the site.

On 22 July 2017 DRS organised an open day at Carlisle Kingmoor TMD. During the open day, loco 66301 was named after the depot, receiving plates with the name 'Kingmoor TMD'. 66301 is the first DRS Class 66 to be named since the type entered traffic with the British operations.

Allocations

DRS has a large number of its fleet at Kingmoor.

See also

 Carlisle Upperby TMD

References
Notes

Sources
 Rail Atlas Great Britain & Ireland, S.K. Baker, 
 Hawkins and Reeve LMS Engines Sheds vol 1 - the L&NWR 

Railway depots in England
Buildings and structures in Carlisle, Cumbria
Transport infrastructure completed in 1968
Rail transport in Cumbria